Always in Trouble is a 1938 American comedy film directed by Joseph Santley, and written by Robert Chapin and Karen DeWolf. The film stars Jane Withers, Jean Rogers, Arthur Treacher, Robert Kellard, Eddie Collins and Andrew Tombes. The film was released on October 28, 1938, by 20th Century Fox.

Plot

Geraldine "Jerry" Darlington felt happier before her father J.C. struck it rich in the oil business and moved the family to Florida. She's irritated by her dad no longer working and her beautiful sister Virginia being pursued by men interested more by her money.

A meek clerk from her dad's office, Pete Graham, is persuaded by Jerry to steer the family's boat. He accidentally runs the vessel aground and ends up falsely suspected of knocking J.C. unconscious and kidnapping the Darlingtons for ransom. Jerry amuses herself at first by not supporting Pete's story, but when real crooks get involved, Pete is able to clear his name and persuade Virginia he's sincere about his attraction to her.

Cast      
Jane Withers as Jerry Darlington 
Jean Rogers as Virginia Darlington 
Arthur Treacher as Rogers
Robert Kellard as Pete Graham
Eddie Collins as Uncle Ed Darlington
Andrew Tombes as J. C. Darlington
Nana Bryant as Mrs. Minnie Darlington
Joan Woodbury as Pearl Mussendorfer
Joe Sawyer as Buster Mussendorfer
Charles Lane as Donald Gower
Pat Flaherty as Gideon Stubbs

References

External links 
 

1938 films
1930s English-language films
20th Century Fox films
American comedy films
1938 comedy films
Films directed by Joseph Santley
American black-and-white films
1930s American films